Below are the squads for the women's football tournament at the 2006 Asian Games, played in Doha, Qatar.

Group A

China
Coach: Ma Liangxing

Japan
Coach: Hiroshi Ohashi

Jordan
Coach: Issa Al-Turk

Thailand
Coach: Chana Yodprang

Group B

Chinese Taipei
Coach: Chou Tai-ying

North Korea
Coach: Kim Kwang-min

South Korea
Coach: An Jong-goan

Vietnam
Coach: Trần Ngọc Thái Tuấn

References
Rosters

External links
Official website

2006
squads